Rat Pack Rat is a 2014 drama short film, written and directed by Todd Rohal. The film had its premiere at 2014 Sundance Film Festival on January 17, 2014. It won the Jury Award at the festival.

The film later screened at 2014 SXSW Film Festival on March 8, 2014. It also marks the final motion picture performance of Eddie Rouse, who died on December 7, 2014 of liver failure.

Plot
A Sammy Davis, Jr. impersonator, was hired by a Rat Pack fan's mother to perform on his birthday.

Cast
Steve Little as Rat Pack fan
Eddie Rouse as Sammy Davis, Jr. impersonator
Margie Beegle as mother

Reception
Rat Pack Rat received mostly positive reviews from critics. Kat Smith of The Hollywood News gave the film four out of five stars and praised the film by saying that "This short will keep you engaged and guessing where the story is going right up until the last minute." Liz Whittemore of Cinemit, gave the film a positive review that "Rat Pack Rat will leave you with mouth gaping open at the end, it is worth every cringe-worthy second."

Accolades

References

External links
 

2014 films
2014 drama films
American drama short films
Sundance Film Festival award winners
2014 short films
2010s English-language films
2010s American films